Tenagodus senegalensis is a species of sea snail, a marine gastropod mollusk in the family Siliquariidae.

References

Siliquariidae
Invertebrates of West Africa
Molluscs of the Atlantic Ocean
Gastropods described in 1860